Brahmani (Sanskrit: ब्रह्माणी, IAST: Brahmāṇī) or Brahmi (Sanskrit: ब्राह्मी, IAST: Brāhmī), is one of the seven Hindu mother goddesses known as Sapta Matrikas. She is a form of Saraswati and is considered as the Shakti of the creator god Brahma in Hinduism. She is an aspect of Adi Shakti, possessing the "Rajas Guna" and is therefore the source of Brahma's power.

Legends

When Brahma was in meditation for the creation of the universe, his body was divided into two parts. They then formed the gods and goddesses, whereby one part was male and the another was female. Thus female parts became Gayatri, Sati Savitri, Saraswati, and others.

In folklore, Brahmani was once reincarnated as the princess of the Illavaku clan. The king had two daughters, Renuka (incarnation of devi Brahmani) and the other being Sahastrakala. Once at the banks of Sarasvati river, sage Jamadagni and the king held the Svayamvara for Renuka and she married the sage. There were clashes between Kshatriyas (warrior) clan and Bhargava (descendants of the sage Bhrigu and Shiva) clan as Jamadagni was Bhargav-vanshi who shifted their residence to western India. Later, for Renuka's sister's wedding, she invited all the Kshatriya's from the west for the celebration. Sage jadmagni did not agree with her act but Renuka was stubborn and she held her words, which Jadmagni agreed to. The couple was poor, but the sage had Kamdhenu and the Akshaya Patra, which they used to make rice. The Kshatriya clan were ashamed and insulted sage Jadmagni, whereby Renuka realized that the reason for Jadmagni's insults was Renuka herself. Soon, the sage and Renuka had a son named Parshurama. Jadmagni told him that if he loved his father, he would need to cut out his mother’s head, which will make Renuka be called Devi Brahmani and will be worshipped. Thus Parshurama killed his mother and she thus received the status of a goddess. Sage Jamdagni asked Shri Parshurama for a boon. Parshuram demanded his mother to be alive again as boon thus Jamdagni returned her to life.

Iconography 

The goddess is depicted yellow in colour with four heads and four(or six) arms. Like Brahma, she holds a japamala, a kamandalu (water pot), a lotus stalk, bells, vedas and the trident while she is seated on a hamsa (identified with a swan or goose) as her vahana (mount or vehicle). Sometimes, she is shown seated on a lotus with a swan on her banner. She wears various ornaments and is distinguished by her basket-shaped crown called .

Kuldevi
She is the Kuldevi (clan goddess) of Vankar (Weaver), Prajapati, nagar brahmins, darji samaj and other communities of Rajasthan and Kutch, including Dodiya Rajputs and the KGK Community.

Brahmani temples in India
Brahmani Mataji Temple at Baran in Rajasthan.
Brahmani Mataji Temple at Pallo near Hanumangarh, Rajasthan.
Brahmani Mata Temple at Village Brahmani, Hanumanganj, near Ballia in Uttar Pradesh.
Brahmani Mata Temple at Bharmour near Chamba, Himachal Pradesh.
Brahmani Mata Temple at Dingucha near Kalol, Gujarat.
Brahmani Mata Temple at Jamiyatpura, Gandhinagar
Brahmani Mata Temple at Sorsan, Rajasthan
Brahmani Mata Temple at Anjar.
Brahmani Mata temple at  Visnagar.
In Narsoli village of Bhiloda district (Gujarat) there are also 1000 year old temples of Shri Brahmani Mata and Shri Eklingji Mahadev which were destroyed in the Mughal attack, their archeological remains are still present and Eklingji temple is being rebuilt at the same place.

See also
 Vaishnavi
 Mahasaraswati
 Tridevi

References 

Hindu goddesses
Mother goddesses
War goddesses
Shaktism